Viktor Flessl (6 November 1898 – 18 December 1943) was an Austrian rower who competed in the 1928 Summer Olympics. In 1928 he won the bronze medal in the double sculls event with his partner Leo Losert.

He was killed in action during World War II.

References

External links
 profile

1898 births
1943 deaths
Austrian male rowers
Olympic rowers of Austria
Rowers at the 1928 Summer Olympics
Olympic bronze medalists for Austria
Olympic medalists in rowing
Medalists at the 1928 Summer Olympics
Austrian military personnel killed in World War II